Kiełp  is a village in the administrative district of Gmina Kijewo Królewskie within Chełmno County, Kuyavian-Pomeranian Voivodeship in north-central Poland.

References

Villages in Chełmno County